The inaugural 1984 Pan American Race Walking Cup was held in Bucaramanga, Santander, Colombia, on 3–4 November.  The track of the Cup runs in the Carrera 27, between Calle 11 and 22.

Complete results, medal winners until 2011, and the results for the Mexican athletes were published.

Medallists

Results

Men's 20 km

Team

Men's 50 km

Team

Women's 10 km

Team

Participation
The participation of 61 athletes from 11 countries is reported.

 (14)
 (4)
 (17)
 (4)
 (17)
 (12)
 México (19)
 Panamá (2)
 (6)
 (13)
 (9)

See also
 1984 Race Walking Year Ranking

References

Pan American Race Walking Cup
Pan American Race Walking Cup
Pan American Race Walking Cup
1984 in South American sport
International athletics competitions hosted by Colombia